David Emong (born 1990) is an Ugandan disabled athlete who competes in sprint and medium distance running. He won Uganda's first Paralympic medal at the 2016 Paralympic Games, gaining a silver medal in the Men's 1500 metres T46.

References

1990 births
Living people
Track and field athletes with disabilities
Ugandan male middle-distance runners
Ugandan male sprinters
Athletes (track and field) at the 2016 Summer Paralympics
Medalists at the 2016 Summer Paralympics
Medalists at the 2020 Summer Paralympics
Paralympic silver medalists for Uganda
Paralympic bronze medalists for Uganda
Paralympic medalists in athletics (track and field)